Scaredy Kat is the stage name of Alex Cubb, also credited as Ally Cubb, a British drag queen, comedian, actor, and writer best known for appearing on series one of RuPaul's Drag Race UK. At the time of filming, they were the youngest drag queen to compete in the British series.

Career and personal life 
Scaredy Kat is one of the few queens on Drag Race not said to be gay, saying: "I just go out with anyone I fall in love with really." Their girlfriend is known as Pussy Kat, and she encouraged Scaredy to try drag.

Scaredy Kat is a vegan and animal rights activist, and has worked with PETA UK on anti-fur campaigns. They have also appeared on Channel 4's Reasons to be Cheerful with Matt Lucas and BBC Three's Pls Like.

In 2022, they appeared in the Netflix's film The School for Good and Evil, directed by Paul Feig, as Gregor.

Filmography

Film
 The School for Good and Evil – Gregor

Television
 RuPaul's Drag Race UK (series 1)

References 

English actors
Bisexual men
Living people
English drag queens
RuPaul's Drag Race UK contestants
Year of birth missing (living people)